Görkem or Gorkem is a Turkish-language masculine and (to a lesser extent also) feminine given name with the meaning "glory, splendor".
Notable people with the name include:
 Ahmet Görkem Görk (1983), Turkish footballer
 Görkem Sağlam (1998), German footballer of Turkish descent
 Görkem Sala (1992), Turkish singer, DJ, and hip hop artist
 Görkem Sevindik (1986), Turkish actor
 Görkem Yeltan (1977), Turkish actress

Turkish masculine given names
Turkish feminine given names